The Santa Clara Convention Center is located in northern Santa Clara, California. It was built in 1986 and expanded in 2009.

The convention center is located in the same complex as the Hyatt Regency Santa Clara and the Santa Clara TechMart conference center.  It is adjacent to the VTA Great America light rail station and across the street from the Great America theme park.

History
The convention center was completed in 1986 and hosted the first Apple Worldwide Developers Conference the following year. The ballroom space was expanded in 2009.

During the COVID-19 pandemic, the Strategic National Stockpile Division of the United States Department of Health and Human Services converted the convention center into a Federal Medical Station to receive up to 250 noncritical patients from local hospitals.

Events
The convention center has hosted the following notable events:
 Apple Worldwide Developers Conference (1987)
 North American Bengali Conference (1999, 2017)
 BayCon with the Hyatt Regency Santa Clara (2008–2015)
 Japan Expo USA (2013)
 Crunchyroll Expo (2017)
 Federal Medical Station in response to the COVID-19 pandemic

See also
San Jose Convention Center
List of convention centers in the United States

References

External links 
 

Buildings and structures in Santa Clara, California
Buildings and structures in Santa Clara County, California
Tourist attractions in Santa Clara, California
Convention centers in California